The discography of New Order, an English rock band, consists of 10 studio albums, 12 compilation albums, six live albums, five extended plays (EPs), 45 singles, 12 video releases, 40 music videos and a number of soundtrack appearances. New Order were formed in 1980 by singer, guitarist and keyboardist Bernard Sumner, bassist Peter Hook and drummer Stephen Morris. The group began life as a continuation of their former incarnation Joy Division. Joy Division had disbanded after the death of the lead singer Ian Curtis. Gillian Gilbert, who was Morris's girlfriend at the time, soon joined the group and played guitar and keyboards.

Remarkably, New Order's first eight singles released between 1981 and 1984 were not taken from any album. In most cases they were not even released as a 7-inch, but exclusively available in the radio-unfriendly 12-inch format, an unusual approach for a pop-act in the eighties.

Despite the high anticipation that surrounded the group, their debut single "Ceremony" only peaked at number 34 on the UK Singles Chart. The group's following two singles and their debut album met with similar moderate success. It would not be until the release of their fourth single, "Blue Monday", that New Order would break into the top 10, with the song peaking at number 9. "Blue Monday" became a defining single for the group and caused a sensation, becoming the biggest selling 12-inch single of all time.

New Order, like many other post-punk groups of the period, increasingly utilised keyboards, drum machine and sequencers in their music. As a result, they became associated with the synthpop and electronic dance movements of the 1980s. Beginning with Power, Corruption & Lies from 1983, all of the group's studio albums reached the top 10 in the United Kingdom. The group experienced a lull in popularity in the years 1985 and 1986 but the surprise international popularity of the "Bizarre Love Triangle" single re-launched the group across the world. The group cemented their success in 1987 with the single, "True Faith", and the compilation album Substance.

New Order were at the peak of their popularity in the years 1987 to 1993, with a run of popular singles, including "Blue Monday 1988", "Fine Time", "Regret", "World (The Price of Love)" and in 1990 they scored their only number 1 single in the UK with the official England national football team song, "World in Motion". The two albums released during these years, Technique and Republic; each charted at number 1 in the UK. It was during this successful period that the group's internal dynamic began to falter. Sumner was not fond of touring, and wanted to take time off from the group and produce a solo album. He formed Electronic with Johnny Marr and the pair released their first single in 1989. Hook formed his own band, Revenge, in 1989, while Morris and Gilbert worked together as The Other Two, primarily scoring soundtracks. Of the three side projects, Sumner's was by far the most successful.

The recording and touring of 1993's Republic, their first for London Records, was difficult and intra-band tensions were rife. The group went on hiatus until 1998. In the meantime two compilation albums, The Best of New Order and The Rest of New Order, and several singles were released.

The group reconvened in 1998 for the Reading Festival but did not release new material until 2000. The group released the album Get Ready in 2001. It was met with critical warmth, but it was apparent that the group's popularity had lessened. The lead single from the album, "Crystal", reached the top 10 in the UK. The film 24 Hour Party People, a humorous chronicle of their label Factory Records, was released in 2002. New Order contributed a new song, "Here to Stay", and a re-recording of the Joy Division song "New Dawn Fades" with Moby, for the film's soundtrack. The compilation International and four-disc boxset Retro were released in winter 2002. New Order followed Get Ready with Waiting for the Sirens' Call in 2005. During this period Gilbert stepped down from live performances due to family commitments. Phil Cunningham stepped into her role and in 2005 became an official member of the group.

The group had intended to release a ninth album soon after Waiting for the Sirens' Call, the majority of which had already been recorded. The lack of enthusiasm inside the group and relative failure of Waiting for the Sirens' Call stalled their career momentum. In 2007, Hook decided to leave the group, and stated that he and Sumner had no further plans to work together. Sumner formed Bad Lieutenant with Cunningham, and Hook formed Freebass. Morris continued to work with Sumner and Cunningham. In 2008, New Order released remastered and expanded editions of their first five albums with the intention of releasing the further three albums in a similar format in the future.
Lost Sirens was released in the United Kingdom on 14 January 2013. It is an eight-track album of tracks left out of Waiting for the Sirens' Call. On 25 September 2015, the band released a new album, Music Complete. The album was the first without Peter Hook, and was produced mostly by the band themselves, except "Singularity" and "Unlearn This Hatred", both produced by Tom Rowlands, while "Superheated" features additional production by Stuart Price. In 2020, New Order released "Be a Rebel", their first non-album single since "Here to Stay" in 2002.

In the US, the band has sold a certified 2 million albums, and in the UK a certified 1.24 million albums.

Albums

Studio albums

Compilations

Live albums

Extended plays

Notes

Singles

Notes

Promotional singles

Miscellaneous
The Peter Saville Show Soundtrack (2003) (limited edition of 3000 copies)
12x12" (2006) (vinyl only releases of 12 singles)

Other appearances

Videos

Music videos

References

 Vinylnet Record Label Discographies. link. - Factory Catalogue Numbers.
 Richard Kernin and Dennis Remmer's complete New Order discography
 [ Billboard.com complete New Order discography]

New Order (band)
Discographies of British artists
Rock music group discographies
Electronic music discographies
New wave discographies